Richard Gibbon Hurndall (3 November 1910 – 13 April 1984) was an English actor. He is best remembered for replacing William Hartnell in the role of the First Doctor for Doctor Who's 20th anniversary special The Five Doctors.

Career

BBC radio
Hurndall was born in Darlington and he attended Claremont Preparatory School, Darlington and Scarborough College, before training as an actor at the Royal Academy of Dramatic Arts. He then appeared in several plays at Stratford-upon-Avon. Hurndall acted with the BBC radio drama repertory company from 1949 to 1952. In 1959, he played Sherlock Holmes in a five part adaptation of The Sign of Four. He continued to play roles on BBC radio until about 1980, often as the leading man.

Radio Luxembourg
In 1958 he became the third host of the Radio Luxembourg program called This I Believe. (This show had originally been hosted by Edward R. Murrow on the U.S. CBS Radio Network from 1951 to 1955 and it was then edited in London for rebroadcast on 208 with a British style of presentation at 9:30 PM on Sunday evenings.)

Television work
Hurndall appeared in numerous radio and stage plays, films and television series over the course of his lengthy career.  He appeared in 'Someone at the Door', a 1949 live broadcast TV comedy / thriller, which also featured Patrick Troughton (with whom he was later to appear in Doctor Who – see below). Other television shows of the era that he appeared in include The Avengers, The Persuaders!, Blake's 7, Whodunnit! and Bergerac. He played the suave London gangster Mackelson in the gritty 1968 drama series Spindoe and the following year had a recurring role as flawed senior civil servant Jason Fowler in the final series of The Power Game. He appeared in the comedy series Steptoe and Son in 1970 as Timothy, a gay antique dealer who takes a shine to Harold Steptoe, in Any Old Iron (series 5 episode 3, 20 March 1970). He guest starred in the third series of Callan. He appeared twice in the series Public Eye, first playing a distinguished entomologist who is unwilling to trace his missing son in "The Golden Boy" (10 January 1973) and later a priest in "How About a Cup of Tea?" (13 January 1975). He was Lord Montdore in Love in a Cold Climate (1980).

Doctor Who
In 1983, to celebrate the 20th anniversary of the BBC science fiction television series Doctor Who, producer John Nathan-Turner planned a special event, The Five Doctors, a 90-minute episode to feature four of the five actors who had at that point played the role of the Doctor. William Hartnell, the actor who originated the role, had died in 1975. Hurndall eventually won the role of the First Doctor, playing him as "acerbic and temperamental but in some ways wiser than his successors." His casting in the role was approved by Hartnell's widow, Heather. When Tom Baker, who played the Fourth Doctor, declined to appear in the programme, Hurndall's role was expanded slightly to have the First Doctor take a greater part in the action.

Films
His films included Joanna (1968), Hostile Witness (1968), Some Girls Do (1969), Zeppelin (1971), I, Monster (1971), Lady Caroline Lamb (1972), Royal Flash (1975), and Crossed Swords (1977).

Death
In April 1984, Hurndall died of a heart attack at the age of 73 in London, less than five months after the first broadcast of The Five Doctors. Many sources, including Elisabeth Sladen's autobiography, state that he died before being paid for the role. However, Doctor Who Magazine writer Richard Bignell claims that this isn't true, saying "Hurndall had five different payments made out to him ... (four contractual, one expenses) and all were paid in 1982 and 1983, way before his death."

Filmography

See also
This I Believe – 1957 second season on Radio Luxembourg

References

External links
 

Alumni of RADA
English male radio actors
English male stage actors
English male film actors
English male television actors
English radio presenters
People from Darlington
1910 births
1984 deaths
People educated at Scarborough College
20th-century English male actors
Actors from County Durham